The Company You Keep is an American drama television series created by Julia Cohen that premiered on ABC on February 19, 2023. The series is based on the South Korean television series My Fellow Citizens!, and stars Milo Ventimiglia and Catherine Haena Kim.

Synopsis
It tells the story of con-man Charlie and undercover CIA officer Emma. A night of passion ignites love between the pair, who are on a collision course professionally.

Cast and characters

Main
 Milo Ventimiglia as Charlie Nicoletti, a masterful high-stakes con man from an Italian American crime family
 Catherine Haena Kim as Emma Hill, an undercover CIA officer from a Chinese-Korean American political dynasty
 Sarah Wayne Callies as Birdie Nicoletti, Charlie's bossy big sister and Ollie’s mother who is a con woman and co-owner of the bar they run together
 Polly Draper as Fran Nicoletti, a con woman, Leo's wife, and Charlie and Birdie's mother
 William Fichtner as Leo Nicoletti, a steel worker turned con man, Fran's husband, and Charlie and Birdie's father, struggling with early onset memory loss.
 Tim Chiou as David Hill, an incumbent Senator currently running for re-election, the son of Joseph, and the brother of Emma
 James Saito as Joseph Hill, the patriarch of a political dynasty considered to be the Asian-American Kennedys
 Freda Foh Shen as Grace Hill, Joseph's wife and Emma and David's mother
 Felisha Terrell as Daphne Finch, an enigmatic consultant to Irish mobster Brendan Maguire

Special guest stars
 Luke Kirby as Jones Malone
 Miguel Gomez as Priest

Recurring

 Sachin Bhatt as Agent Micah Singh, an FBI agent
 Geoff Stults as Simon Norris, Birdie’s ex and Ollie’s absent father who comes from a wealthy East Coast family and is a recovering addict

Episodes

Production

Development
On March 4, 2022, ABC ordered a pilot for the series with Milo Ventimiglia in the lead. On May 6, 2022, Ben Younger was tapped to direct and executive produce the pilot penned by Julia Cohen. The series was ordered to series and set to debut at midseason in 2023 on August 22, 2022.

Casting
Milo Ventimiglia joined the pilot in the leading role of Charlie and as executive producer on March 4, 2022. On April 27, 2022, Catherine Haena Kim was cast as Emma in the pilot alongside Milo Ventimiglia. William Fichtner was cast in the pilot as Leo on May 2, 2022. On May 20, 2022, Sarah Wayne Callies, James Saito, Tim Chiou, Freda Foh Shen, and Felisha Terrell joined the pilot as leads. Polly Draper was revealed to be amongst the cast when the series was ordered. On February 2, 2023, Sachin Bhatt joined the cast in a recurring role. On March 17, 2023, Geoff Stults was cast in a recurring capacity.

Filming
Principal photography for the pilot began on April 30, 2022, in Los Angeles, California.

Reception

Critical response
The review aggregator website Rotten Tomatoes reported an 84% approval rating with an average rating of 6.5/10, based on 19 critic reviews. The website's critics consensus reads, "The Company You Keep gets off to a rocky start in the first few episodes, but the show's appealing cast and entertaining blend of crime and romance will pay off for patient viewers." Metacritic, which uses a weighted average, assigned a score of 67 out of 100 based on 13 critics, indicating "generally favorable reviews".

Ratings

References

External links
 

2020s American drama television series
2023 American television series debuts
American Broadcasting Company original programming
American television series based on South Korean television series
English-language television shows
Television series about the Central Intelligence Agency
Television series by 20th Century Fox Television
Television series set in the 2020s